Farajabad (also Romanized as Farajābād) is a village in Kiyaras Rural District, in the Central District of Gotvand County, Khuzestan Province, Iran. At the 2006 census, its population was 78, in 14 families.

References 

Populated places in Gotvand County